Anolis nicefori, Niceforo's Andes anole, is a species of lizard in the family Dactyloidae. The species is found in Venezuela and Colombia.

References

Anoles
Reptiles described in 1944
Reptiles of Venezuela
Reptiles of Colombia
Taxa named by Emmett Reid Dunn